Satellite flare, also known as satellite glint, is a satellite pass visible to the naked eye as a brief, bright "flare". It is caused by the reflection toward the Earth below of sunlight incident on satellite surfaces such as solar panels and antennas (e.g., synthetic aperture radar).  Streaks from satellite flare are a form of light pollution that can negatively affect ground-based astronomy, stargazing, and indigenous people.

Many satellites flare with magnitudes bright enough to see with the unaided eye, i.e. brighter than magnitude +6.5.  Smaller magnitude numbers are brighter, so negative magnitudes are brighter than positive magnitudes, i.e. the scale is reverse logarithmic .

The Iridium constellation was one of the first anthropogenic sources of near-space light pollution to draw criticism.  Larger satellite constellations, like OneWeb and Starlink, have received increased criticism.  Scientific and policy analyses have raised questions about which regulatory bodies hold jurisdiction over human actions that obscure starlight in ways that affect astronomy, stargazers, and indigenous communities.

Controlled satellites 

The time and place of the satellite's flare can be predicted only when the satellite is controlled, and its orientation in space is known. In this case it is possible to predict the exact time of the flare, its place in the sky, the brightness and duration.

Iridium flares 

The first generation of the Iridium constellation launched a total of 95 telecommunication satellites in low Earth orbit which were known to cause Iridium flares, the brightest flares of all orbiting satellites, starting in 1997. From 2017 to 2019 they were replaced with a new generation that does not produce flares, with the first generation completely deorbited by 27 December 2019.

While the first-generation Iridium satellites were still controlled, their flares could be predicted. These Iridium communication satellites had three polished door-sized antennas, 120° apart and at 40° angles with the main bus. The forward antenna faced the direction the satellite is traveling. Occasionally, an antenna reflects sunlight directly down at Earth, creating a predictable and quickly moving illuminated spot on the surface below of about  diameter. To an observer this looks like a bright flash, or flare in the sky, with a duration of a few seconds.

Ranging up to −9.5 magnitude, some of the flares were so bright that they could be seen in the daytime. This flashing caused some annoyance to astronomers, as the flares occasionally disturbed observations.

As the Iridium constellation consisted of 66 working satellites, Iridium flares were visible quite often (2 to 4 times per night). Flares of brightness −5 magnitude occurred 3 to 4 times per week, and −8 magnitude were visible 3 to 5 times per month for stationary observers.

Flares could also occur from solar panels, but they were not as bright (up to −3.5 magnitude). Such flares lasted about twice as long as those from the main mission antennas (MMA), because the so-called "mirror angle" for the solar panels was twice that for the MMAs. There were also rare cases of flares from MMAs and solar panels, or two MMAs (front and either right or left) of one satellite in a single pass.

The flares were bright enough to be seen at night in big cities where light pollution usually prevents most stellar observation. When not flaring, the satellites were often visible crossing the night sky at a typical magnitude of 6, similar to a dim star.

Mega-constellations 

Planned low-orbit satellite constellations such as Starlink are a concern for astronomers, stargazers, and indigenous communities because of light pollution.

In February 2020, the Russian Academy of Sciences said it would send a letter to the United Nations complaining that Starlink's satellites will damage "30-40% of astronomical images."

Numerous satellite operators have criticized SpaceX for attempting to overwhelm the FCC with paperwork as a means to gain approval to launch 42,000 satellites, which has raised questions about which aspects of space law pertain to light pollution from satellites.

In normal dark sky conditions, the naked eye can see objects as dim as +6.5m, which means about 5,600 stars or about one star for every seven of the planned Starlink satellites.  In perfect dark sky conditions about 45,000 stars brighter than +8m can be visible to the naked eye, or about one-to-one with the proposed Starlink satellites.  Ground based telescopes are even more sensitive, so astronomers have raised concerns about the persistent brightness of Starlink.

SpaceX and Elon Musk have asserted in meetings with the National Academy of Sciences and in FCC filings that "SpaceX is committed to reducing satellite brightness to allow enjoyment of the skies and not thwart scientific discovery" and that its objectives are (1) to "make the satellites generally invisible to the naked eye within a week of launch," and (2) to "minimize Starlink's impact on astronomy by darkening satellites so they do not saturate observatory detectors."

Other satellite flares 
 

Many other controlled satellites also flare to magnitudes visible to the naked eye, i.e. larger than +6.5.

MetOp-B and C, however, can produce predictable flares up to −5 magnitude (MetOp-A in no longer controlled) . Four COSMO-SkyMed satellites can produce flares up to -3 magnitude, and lasting much longer than the Iridium flares.
The Terrasar X and Tandem X also can produce predictable flares up to -3 magnitude. 

The International Space Station (ISS) is known to cause bright ISS flares.

Starlink flares can flare repeatedly in one area of the sky. This is due to the large number of Starlink satellites that are orbiting the Earth. The flares from Starlink have been misidentified as UFOs by airline pilots due to their strange repetitive nature which appears similar to an aircraft flying a racetrack holding pattern .

Uncontrolled satellites 

When a satellite's orientation goes out of control, it becomes possible to predict only a trajectory of its pass, at any point of which it can flare up. These satellites are also described as "tumbling". This category includes many rotating rocket bodies, some failed Iridium satellites, ALOS satellite (which can produce flashes up to −10 mag), etc.
The most important and valuable information about tumbling satellites is the period of flashes. It can vary from 0.3–0.5 seconds (rapidly rotating objects) to a minute or more (slowly rotating objects). Other important characteristics are the amplitude of changes in brightness and period of repetition of these changes.

Humanity Star was a passive satellite which is primarily designed to produce satellite flares.

Observation 

While satellites may be seen by chance, there are websites and mobile apps which provide location specific information as to when and where in the sky a satellite flare may be seen (for controlled satellites), or trajectory of a tumbling satellite's pass (for uncontrolled satellites) in the sky.

Among others, reflections from satellites and other human space objects are often reported as unidentified flying objects (UFOs).

See also 
 NanoSail-D

References

External links

  – PreviSat software which calculates satellite flares (Iridium, MetOp, SkyMed)
  – schedule of upcoming Iridium flares
  – IridiumFlares prediction software (Java application)
  – "Catch a Flaring Iridium" at Visual Satellite Observer
  – SkyGuide
  Iridium 25 flare near the Moon

Satellites
Visibility